Jaylon O'Neal Ferguson (December 14, 1995 – June 21, 2022) was an American football outside linebacker and defensive end. He played college football at Louisiana Tech before being drafted 85th overall by the Baltimore Ravens of the National Football League (NFL) in the 2019 NFL Draft. He played three seasons with the Ravens.

Early years
Ferguson attended West Feliciana High School in St. Francisville, Louisiana, where he played football and basketball for four years.

College career
Ferguson redshirted his first year at Louisiana Tech in 2014. In 2015, he played in 12 games with five starts and recorded 35 tackles and six sacks. As a sophomore in 2016, he set the school record for sacks in a season with 14.5. As a junior in 2017, Ferguson had 38 tackles and seven sacks. He returned to Louisiana Tech for his senior year in 2018. During the season he broke the school record for career sacks and broke his own school record for sacks in a single-season with 17.5. Ferguson became the NCAA FBS career sack leader during the 2018 Hawaii Bowl, and was also named winning-team MVP of that game.

In February 2019, the National Football League rescinded their invitation to Ferguson to attend the NFL Scouting Combine after discovering his misdemeanor simple battery conviction from 2015.

College statistics

Professional career

Ferguson was drafted by the Baltimore Ravens in the third round (85th overall) of the 2019 NFL Draft. On July 19, 2019, Ferguson was placed on the reserve/NFI list with a hamstring injury. He was removed two days later. On September 22, 2019, Ferguson made his NFL debut, recording 18 snaps against the Kansas City Chiefs. He recorded his first-career tackle two weeks later against the Pittsburgh Steelers. He made his first NFL start on November 3 against the New England Patriots. On November 17, Ferguson recorded his first-career sack against the Houston Texans, bringing down Deshaun Watson in the second quarter. Three weeks later, he would record his second sack against the Buffalo Bills, sacking Josh Allen.

In Week 4 of the 2020 season against the Washington Football Team, Ferguson recorded his first sack of the season on Dwayne Haskins during the 31–17 win. Ferguson was placed on the reserve/COVID-19 list by the Ravens on November 28, 2020, and activated two days later. In the 2020 season, Ferguson started in one game and appeared in 14 total, finishing the season with 2.0 sacks and 30 tackles. In 2021, Ferguson appeared in 10 games, recording six tackles but no sacks.

Personal life and death
Ferguson had a son and two daughters with his fiancée. 

Ferguson died in Baltimore on June 21, 2022, at the age of 26. Police indicated that while the death was "questionable", there were initially no signs of foul play or trauma. The next day, the Ravens released a statement stating: "We are profoundly saddened by the tragic passing of Jaylon Ferguson. He was a kind, respectful young man with a big smile and infectious personality. We express our heartfelt condolences to Jaylon's family and friends as we mourn a life lost much too soon." His death was later declared to be caused by the combined effects of fentanyl and cocaine, and it was ruled that the death was accidental.

References

External links
 Baltimore Ravens bio
 Louisiana Tech Bulldogs bio

1995 births
2022 deaths
African-American players of American football
American football defensive ends
American football outside linebackers
Baltimore Ravens players
Cocaine-related deaths in Maryland
Drug-related deaths in Maryland
Louisiana Tech Bulldogs football players
People from Zachary, Louisiana
Players of American football from Louisiana